St. Julien Ravenel (December 15, 1819 – March 16, 1882) was an American physician and agricultural chemist. During the American Civil War, he designed the torpedo boat CSS David that was used to attack the Union ironclad USS New Ironsides. Following the war, he helped pioneer the use of fertilizers in agriculture and led the growth of phosphate fertilizer manufacturing in Charleston, South Carolina.

Early career and family
Born in Charleston, South Carolina, St. Julien was the oldest child of merchant and ship owner John Ravenel and his wife Anna Eliza Ford. After attending grammar schools in Charleston, he left for Morristown, New Jersey to continue his education. In 1840 he graduated from the Medical College in Charleston after studying medicine under J. E. Holbrook, then continued his studies for a summer in Philadelphia and a year at Paris, France. Returning to Charleston, he began to practice medicine and was named Demonstrator of Anatomy at the Medical College.

Finding the medical work distasteful and disliking the drudgery of being a doctor, he began an association with Professor Louis Agassiz, studying microscopy, natural history, and physiology. When the American Association for the Advancement of Science met in Charleston during 1850, Dr. Ravenel was the treasurer.

On March 20, 1851, he married writer and historian Harriott Horry Rutledge (1832–1912), the sole child of Edward Cotesworth Rutledge and Rebecca Motte Lowndes. Between 1852 and 1872, St. Julien and Harriott would have nine children. Their son Francis '(Frank') Gualdo Ravenel married the poet Beatrice Witte.

St. Julien undertook the study of chemistry beginning in 1852. However, he did not completely forsake his previous work. When an outbreak of Yellow Fever struck Norfolk, Virginia in 1855, he was one of the first on the scene and worked throughout the epidemic to aid the patients. At his Stony Landing Plantation along the Cooper River, he experimented with the production of lime from marl deposits located along the river banks. After cement was discovered under the limestone layers, in 1856 he partnered with Clement H. Stevens to establish the Colleton Lime Works at his plantation which sold lime for 0.90c per barrel. This company would provide most of the lime used by the southern states during the American Civil War.

Civil War
With the outbreak of the Civil War in 1861, Dr. Ravenel volunteered with the Phoenix rifles and served as a private during the siege of Fort Sumter. Thereafter he was commissioned as a surgeon with the 24th South Carolina infantry, under the command of Colonel Clement H. Stevens. The following year, he was placed in charge of the Confederate Hospital in Columbia, South Carolina where Confederate soldiers from Virginia and elsewhere were being treated.

With the Northern fleet blockading the South's ports, the torpedo boat was devised as a counterblockade weapon. In 1863, the first purpose-built torpedo boat was conceived and built near Charleston, South Carolina using private funding. Using an earlier concept of Ross Winans, Dr. Ravenel provided the initial design for the vessel and the construction was completed with the aid of David C. Ebaugh. Named the David, this cigar-shaped, semi-submersible vessel was fitted with a torpedo at the end of 14-foot iron spar mounted at the bow. The idea was to drive the steam-powered boat at an enemy ship and detonate the torpedo along the hull. On October 5, 1863, the CSS David was used to attack the USS New Ironsides near Charleston Harbor, causing damage but failing to breach the hull.

Ravenel's knowledge of chemistry was put to use when he was placed in charge of a laboratory in Columbia, South Carolina that was used to manufacture nearly all of the South's medical supplies, including drugs and medicines. As General Sherman's army approached, the laboratory was ordered to entrain for a location in North Carolina. His wife Harriott stayed behind with their provisions and thus was witness to the arrival of the Union army and the burning of the city.

Post-war period
Prior to the war, Dr. Ravenel had begun experimenting with chemistry for improvement of agricultural conditions. He resumed his investigations in 1866, where he discovered the benefit of using phosphate of lime in agriculture. He was able to increase the cotton yield in one section of his plantation from 100–150 pounds per acre up to 300–400 pounds. In August, 1867, Ravenal and N. A. Pratt discovered a rich concentration of this mineral at Lambs, South Carolina. As a result, he helped to found the fertilizer manufacturer Wando Phosphate Company. Over time, this led to a burgeoning fertilizer industry that helped the commercial recovery of South Carolina.

For the remainder of his career, he served as chemist to the larger phosphate companies. Among his accomplishments were the development of simpler fertilizer manufacturing techniques, a method of growing abundant short grain and hay on the sandy South Carolina coast, and the boring of artesian wells of moderate depth in the Charleston area to supply water to local manufacturing industries. For the last, he is now known as the "father of Charleston's artesian well system". St. Julien Ravenel died of cirrhosis of the liver, March 15, 1882, and was survived by his wife, four sons, and five daughters.

Writing under the pseudonym of H. Hilton Broom, his wife Harriott won a Charleston newspaper prize for her 1879 novel Ashurst. She later published Eliza Pinckney (1896), The Life and Times of William Lowndes of South Carolina (1901), and Charleston, the Place and the People (1906).

References

External links
 
 

1819 births
1882 deaths
19th-century American physicians
19th-century American chemists
Physicians from South Carolina
Medical University of South Carolina alumni
People from Charleston, South Carolina
People of South Carolina in the American Civil War
Confederate States Army surgeons
Deaths from cirrhosis